R-word may refer to:

 R-word index, short for recession index
 R-word, a euphemism for Retard (pejorative), a pejorative term for mentally disabled people
 R-word, another euphemism for Redskin, a pejorative term describing Native Americans in the United States and Indigenous peoples in Canada